Asterostroma is a genus of fungi in the Lachnocladiaceae family. The genus contains 14 species, which collectively have a widespread distribution.

Species
A. andinum
A. apalum
A. boninense
A. cervicolor
A. cremeofulvum
A. laxum
A. medium
A. macrosporum
A. muscicola
A. persimile
A. pseudofulvum

References

External links

Russulales
Russulales genera